Oakleaf was a Gosport-based brewery founded in 2000 in Gosport, Hampshire, England. It brewed cask ales and bottled ales until filing for Administration in August 2016 due to the rise of microbreweries. In September 2016, the brewery was purchased, staff rescued from administration and the new brewery, Fallen Acorn Brewing Co, began.

Ales

Cask and Bottled Ales
Hole Hearted
Quercus Folium
Nuptu' Ale
Pompey Royal
I Can't Believe It's Not Bitter
IPA

Bottled only ales
May Bee Mild
Stokers Stout
Blakes Gosport Bitter
Over the Top
Blakes Heaven (Stronger version of Blakes Gosport Bitter)

References

External links
Oakleaf

Breweries in England
Food and drink companies established in 2000
Food and drink companies disestablished in 2016
Companies that have entered administration in the United Kingdom
British companies established in 2000